Extant ancient texts provide a list of the names of 51 students who attended the law school of Beirut; these students came from twenty different Roman provinces. Some of those students were deemed notable and achieved fame.

Below is a list compiled by French scholar Paul Collinet; it includes the provinces and known cities from which each student originated.

Notable students 
Extant ancient texts provide a list of the names of 51 students who attended the law school of Beirut; these students came from twenty different Roman provinces. Some of those students were deemed notable and achieved fame.

In his 238 AD Panegyric to Christian scholar Origen of Alexandria, Cappadocian bishop Gregory Thaumaturgus relates taking extensive Latin and Roman law courses in Beirut.

According to Eusebius of Caesarea, Pamphilus of Caesarea was born into a rich family in Beirut in the latter half of the 3rd century and attended its law school. Pamphilus later became the presbyter of Caesarea Maritima and the founder of its extensive Christian library. He is celebrated as a martyr by both the Roman Catholic Church and the Eastern Orthodox Church. Eusebius also tells of martyred brothers Aphian and Aedesius, born to a noble Lycian family. They converted to Christianity while studying law in Beirut and were persecuted and executed for their beliefs.

Fourth-century historian Eunapius wrote of Anatolius, a high-ranking Roman official known to his enemies as Azutrio. Anatolius occupied the offices of consul of Syria, vicarius of the Diocese of Asia, proconsul of Constantinople, urban prefect of Constantinople in 354, and Praetorian prefect of Illyricum until his death in 360. In his account of Anatolius, Eunapius summarized: "He reached the summit of the science of law. Nothing about this is surprising because Beirut, his homeland, is the mother and nurse of these studies". Libanius' correspondence with Gaianus of Tyre discusses the latter's achievements after his graduation from the law school of Beirut; Gaianus became the consular governor of Phoenicia in 362. Gazan lawyer and church historian Sozomen, also a law student at Beirut, wrote in his Historia Ecclesiastica about Triphyllius, a convert to Christendom who became the bishop of Nicosia. Triphyllius received legal training in Beirut and was criticized by his teacher Saint Spyridon for his atticism and for using legal vocabulary instead of that of the Bible.

Zacharias Rhetor studied law at Beirut between 487 and 492, then worked as a lawyer in Constantinople until his imperial contacts won him the appointment as bishop of Mytilene. Among Rhetor's works is the biography of Severus, the last miaphysite patriarch of Antioch and one of the founders of the Syriac Orthodox Church, who had also been a law student in Beirut as of 486. Another late 5th-century student was John Rufus, an anti-Chalcedonian priest who moved to Maiuma after the expulsion of his master, Peter the Fuller. In Maiuma, John Rufus authored the Plerophoriae and the Life of Peter the Iberian.

References

Bibliography 

 
 
 
 
 

Roman law